Panevėžys municipality can refer to either of these two municipalities in Lithuania:

 Panevėžys
 Panevėžys District Municipality